Bustanak (also Romanized as Būstānak; also known as Boostanak Andika and Būstānak-e Andīkā) is a village in Qaleh-ye Khvajeh Rural District, in the Central District of Andika County, Khuzestan Province, Iran. At the 2006 census, its population was 58, in 9 families.

References 

Populated places in Andika County